The Rowe Memorial Handicap was an American Thoroughbred horse race run between 1930 and 1954 at Bowie Race Track in Bowie, Maryland. A six furlong sprint run on dirt, the event was open to horses age three and older.

First run on April 5, 1930, the race was originally named to honor James Rowe, a widely respected trainer and future U.S. Racing Hall of Fame inductee who had died in 1929. However, his son James Jr., who had successfully followed in his father's footsteps, died from a heart attack in 1931 at age forty-two and the race name would be shortened to the "Rowe Memorial" to honor both men.

Historical notes
The inaugural James Rowe Memorial Handicap was won by Battleship, a son of the legendary Man o' War.  He was bred and raced on the flat by Walter Salmon but who would sell the horse to Marion duPont Scott at the end of 1931. She had Battleship trained for steeplechase racing and in 1934 he won the American Grand National, the most important steeplechase event in the United States. Sent to race in England, in 1938 Battleship became only the second American-bred horse to ever win the world's most prestigious steeplechase race, the Grand National. A 1969 U.S. Racing Hall of Fame inductee, through 2021 Battleship remains the only horse to have won both the American and English Grand Nationals.  

Following the United States government's imposition of World War II rationing, the restrictions saw all four Maryland tracks having to run their 1944 spring meets at Baltimore's Pimlico Race Course. The April 12, 1944 Rowe Memorial, raced on a muddy track, was won by the increasingly powerful Calumet Farm stable with their colt Pensive who won by a head over runner-up Porter's Cap owned by Charles S. Howard of Seabiscuit fame. Pensive went on to win the May 6, 1944 Kentucky Derby and a week later, the May 13 Preakness Stakes. 

The Rowe Memorial was run for the last time on April 17, 1954. For owner Constance Pistorio and her trainer J. Bowes Bond, it marked their third straight win of this event.

Records
Speed record:
 1:11.00 @ 6 furlongs: Tuscany (1952)

Most wins:
 2 – Tuscany (1952, 1953)

Most wins by a jockey:
 2 - Silvio Coucci (1934, 1935)
 2 - Jack Westrope (1937, 1947)
 2 - Nick Shuk (1953, 1954)

Most wins by a trainer:
 3 - J. Bowes Bond (1952, 1953, 1954)

Most wins by an owner:
 3 - Constance Pistorio (1952, 1953, 1954)

Winners

References

Bowie Race Track
Horse races in Maryland
Open sprint category horse races
Discontinued horse races
Recurring sporting events established in 1930
Recurring sporting events disestablished in 1955